Marjorie Cox Crawford (née Cox; 1903–1983) was an Australian tennis player who reached at least the singles quarterfinals at the Australian Championships seven out of the nine times she played the event.  Her best result was a runner-up finish in 1931, losing to Coral McInnes Buttsworth in three sets.

Crawford teamed with Buttsworth in 1932 to win the women's doubles title at the Australian Championships.  Crawford was the runner-up in that event in 1926 (teaming with Daphne Akhurst Cozens) and 1930 (teaming with Sylvia Lance Harper).  She also partnered with Jack Crawford, a six-time winner of singles titles in Grand Slam tournaments and a member of the International Tennis Hall of Fame, to win the mixed doubles title at the Australian Championships in 1931, 1932, and 1933. They were the runners-up in 1929 and 1930. The couple married in Sydney on 28 February 1930.

Grand Slam finals

Singles: 1 (1 runner-up)

Doubles: 3 (1 titles, 2 runner-up)

Mixed doubles: 5 (3 titles, 2 runner-up)

Grand Slam singles tournament timeline

See also 
 Performance timelines for all female tennis players who reached at least one Grand Slam final

References

1983 deaths
Australian Championships (tennis) champions
Australian female tennis players
Grand Slam (tennis) champions in women's doubles
Grand Slam (tennis) champions in mixed doubles
1903 births
Date of birth missing
Date of death missing
Place of birth missing